Gouverneur (pronounced GUH-vuh-nor) is a town in St. Lawrence County, New York, United States. As of the 2020 census, the population was 3,526.  That down from  7,085 in 2010. The town is named after statesman and landowner Gouverneur Morris.

The Town of Gouverneur contains a village named Gouverneur.  The town is near the southwestern border of St. Lawrence County and is southwest of Canton, the county seat.

History
The region was first settled around 1805.

The Town of Gouverneur was formed in 1810 from part of the Town of Oswegatchie (previously an area called "Town of Cambria").

In 1850, the community of Gouverneur set itself off from the town by incorporating as a village.

The town economy was based in part on mining marble, talc, and zinc.

The United States Post Office was listed on the National Register of Historic Places in 1989.

Geography
According to the United States Census Bureau, the town has a total area of 72.4 square miles (187.6 km2), of which 71.5 square miles (185.3 km2)  is land and 0.9 square mile (2.3 km2)  (1.24%) is water.

The Oswegatchie River flows through the town in two directions, westward in the south and eastward in the north.

U.S. Route 11, New York State Route 58, and New York State Route 812 converge at Gouverneur village. NY-58 and NY-812 are conjoined southwest of the village, and US-11 and NY-812 are conjoined northeast of the village. Due to the low area population and relatively little through traffic, the area's highways and the Gouverneur Town Court experience relatively light traffic flow.

Demographics

As of the census of 2000, there were 7,418 people, 2,484 households, and 1,674 families residing in the town.  The population density was 49.3 people per square mile (19.0/km2).  There were 2,724 housing units at an average density of 38.1 per square mile (14.7/km2).  The racial makeup of the town was 85.43% White, 9.46% Black or African American, 0.40% Native American, 0.39% Asian, 0.13% Pacific Islander, 2.95% from other races, and 1.23% from two or more races. Hispanic or Latino of any race were 5.86% of the population.

There were 2,484 households, out of which 34.8% had children under the age of 18 living with them, 50.7% were married couples living together, 12.3% had a female householder with no husband present, and 32.6% were non-families. 26.7% of all households were made up of individuals, and 12.7% had someone living alone who was 65 years of age or older.  The average household size was 2.54 and the average family size was 3.06.

In the town, the population was spread out, with 24.5% under the age of 18, 10.1% from 18 to 24, 33.8% from 25 to 44, 20.0% from 45 to 64, and 11.7% who were 65 years of age or older.  The median age was 34 years. For every 100 females, there were 124.0 males.  For every 100 females age 18 and over, there were 129.7 males.

The median income for a household in the town was $27,701, and the median income for a family was $31,212. Males had a median income of $31,280 versus $19,394 for females. The per capita income for the town was $13,820.  About 18.9% of families and 19.7% of the population were below the poverty line, including 26.7% of those under age 18 and 11.4% of those age 65 or over.

Communities and locations in Gouverneur
Elmdale – A hamlet in the northwestern part of the town on NY-58 and the Oswegatchie River.
Gouverneur – The Village of Gouverneur is on US-11 at the Oswegatchie River, near the eastern town line.
Halls Corners – A hamlet in the northern part of the town, south of North Gouverneur.
Little Bow – A hamlet northwest of Gouverneur village.
Natural Dam – A hamlet on NY-58 west of Gouverneur village, where Gouverneur Morris once had a summer home. The name arose due to a large rock, partially blocking the Oswegatchie River.
North Gouverneur – A hamlet in the northern part of the town west of County Road 11.
Reservoir Hill – An elevation by the town line, east of Gouverneur village.
Staplin Corners – A hamlet in the northern part of the town, north of North Gouverneur.

Notable people
 Phil Hanlon (b. 1955), mathematician and current president of Dartmouth College
 Brian Leonard (b. 1984), former running back for the Tampa Bay Buccaneers
 Edward John Noble (1882–1958), developer and marketer of Life Savers
 Thomas Lee Pangle (b. 1944), political scientist
 William R. Rowley (1824–1886), American Civil War general
 Lillian Tait Sheldon (1865–1925), composer
 Ella May Smith, (1860–1934), pianist and writer
 Tudi Wiggins (1935–2006), Canadian actress in daytime television dramas
 James Franklin Wiley, member of the Wisconsin State Senate

References

External links
  Gouverneur history
 Gouverneur historical map

Towns in St. Lawrence County, New York